Hibbs is a surname. Notable people with the surname include:

Albert Hibbs, American mathematician
Ben Hibbs (1901–1975), American writer and editor
Harry Hibbs (footballer) (1906–1984),  English footballer
Harry Hibbs (musician) (1942–1989), Canadian musician
Jesse Hibbs (1906–1985), American film and television director
Jim Hibbs (born 1944), American baseball player
Loren Hibbs (born 1961), American baseball player and coach
Robert John Hibbs (1943–1966), American military officer and Medal of Honor recipient

See also
W. B. Hibbs and Company Building, listed on the National Register of Historic Places in Washington, D.C.